Ayata Municipality is the second municipal section of the Muñecas Province in the  La Paz Department, Bolivia. Its seat is Ayata.

References 
 www.ine.gov.bo / census 2001: Ayata Municipality

External links 
 Map of the Muñecas Province

Municipalities of La Paz Department (Bolivia)